Victor Anonsen (born May 19, 1954) is a Canadian artist and former professional football player, born in Moose Jaw, who played in the Canadian Football League as a wide receiver.

A graduate of the University of Manitoba, in 1978 he played three games with the Calgary Stampeders and two regular season games and three play-off games - including the Grey Cup - with the Montreal Alouettes. In 1979 he played 12 games with the Toronto Argonauts and two with the Winnipeg Blue Bombers. Anonsen caught 8 passes for 115 yards in his career. He is now an artist in Victoria, British Columbia.

References

Montreal Alouettes players
Calgary Stampeders players
Toronto Argonauts players
Winnipeg Blue Bombers players
Canadian football wide receivers
Living people
Sportspeople from Moose Jaw
Players of Canadian football from Saskatchewan
Manitoba Bisons football players
1954 births